Pseudophytoecia africana is a species of beetle in the family Cerambycidae. It was described by Per Olof Christopher Aurivillius in 1914. It is known from Kenya and the Democratic Republic of the Congo.

References

Saperdini
Beetles described in 1914